Peroxisome assembly protein 26 is a protein that in humans is encoded by the PEX26 gene.

Interactions 

PEX26 has been shown to interact with PEX1, PEX6 and SUFU.

References

Further reading

External links 
  GeneReviews/NCBI/NIH/UW entry on Peroxisome Biogenesis Disorders, Zellweger Syndrome Spectrum
 OMIM entries on Peroxisome Biogenesis Disorders, Zellweger Syndrome Spectrum